BandPage was a music startup based in San Francisco, California that produced the application BandPage, which powered over 500,000 artists' Facebook Pages. Artists could upload and share tracks, videos, photos, and their touring schedule within Facebook. In August 2010, Billboard named BandPage one of the "Top 10 Best Digital Media Startups."

On February 12, 2016, BandPage was acquired by Google via subsidiary YouTube for $8 million, which discontinued features on the band page editor and other website features.

See also
 Social network
 Social software

References

Companies based in San Francisco
Internet properties established in 2009
American music websites
Meta Platforms applications
2009 establishments in California
Google acquisitions